Mazinho (born 1966), full name Iomar do Nascimento, is a Brazilian football manager and former football utility midfielder

Mazinho is the name of:

Mazinho Oliveira (born 1965), full name Waldemar Aureliano de Oliveira Filho, Brazilian football forward
Mazinho (footballer, born 1987), full name Anderson Soares da Silva, Brazilian football forward
Mazinho (footballer, born 1988), full name Osmar dos Santos Filho, Brazilian football defensive midfielder
Mazinho (footballer, born 1989), full name José Osmar Ventura da Paz, Brazilian football midfielder